San Millán may refer to:

Places
San Millán de la Cogolla, a village in La Rioja, Spain
San Millán de Lara, a village in Burgos, Spain 
San Millán de los Caballeros, a village in León, Spain

Persons
Áurea of San Millán, or Saint Aurea, female saint from 11th century Spain
Emilian of Cogolla, or San Millán, saint from 5th or 6th century in Spain

Institutions
Monasteries of San Millán de la Cogolla, the San Millán de Suso and San Millán de Yuso monasteries